Krombia belutschistanalis is a moth in the family Crambidae. It was described by Hans Georg Amsel in 1961. It is found in Iran.

References

Cybalomiinae
Moths described in 1961